The Churchill Years is a Big Finish Productions audio play series based on the TV show Doctor Who. It sees the return of Ian McNeice as Winston Churchill from the Eleventh Doctor era. The first volume of stories was released in January 2016 and a second volume was released in February 2018.

Episodes

Volume 1 (2016)

Volume 2 (2018)

References

Audio plays based on Doctor Who
Big Finish Productions
Doctor Who spin-offs
Cultural depictions of Winston Churchill